Kaffeine is a media player for Unix-like operating systems by KDE. By default it uses libVLC media framework but also supports GStreamer. It also supports the use of MPlayer project's binary codecs for proprietary formats. Kaffeine developers have also produced a Mozilla plugin to start the player for streaming content over the web.

Features include streaming, DVB, DVD, Video CD and CD audio.

See also

References

External links 
 
 

Extragear
Free media players
Free software programmed in C++
KDE Applications
Linux media players
Software DVD players
Software that uses GStreamer
Video software that uses Qt